Tomorrow Never Dies is a 1997 James Bond film.

Tomorrow Never Dies may also refer to:
 Tomorrow Never Dies (video game), a 1999 game based on the film
 "Tomorrow Never Dies" (song), theme song of the film by Sheryl Crow
 Tomorrow Never Dies (soundtrack)
 Chikara Tomorrow Never Dies, a 2014 professional wrestling pay-per-view
 "Tomorrow Never Dies", a song by 5 Seconds of Summer